Don Failla is an American author best known for his work in multi-level marketing industry.

Works
Failla has been working in MLM since the 1960s. As of 2011, he had sold over 4.5 million copies of his books in 23 languages worldwide. His book, 10 Lessons on Napkins, is the fundamental for MLM companies to based on.

Books
 10 Lessons on Napkins (1968)
 The 45 Second Presentation that Will Change Your Life (1984)
 The Basics How to Build a Large Successful Multi-Level Marketing Organization (1996)
 The System: The 3 Steps to Building a Large, Successful Network Marketing Organization (2006)
 The System: And Other Tools for Rapid Success in Network Marketing (2009)

References

External links
 Don Failla's official website

Living people
21st-century American writers
Multi-level marketing
Year of birth missing (living people)